El Castillo del Cacao is Nicaragua's first commercial chocolate factory based in Matagalpa, on the outskirts of cacao growing areas of Matiguás and Waslala. It was established in 2005 by a Dutch national who was surprised by the wasting of cacao in the countryside, yet no chocolate in the local supermarkets.

Starting with a 3000 Euro investment, the company now sells chocolate bars throughout Central America.

External links 
 

Companies of Nicaragua
Chocolate companies
Nicaraguan brands